In Greek mythology, Laophonte (Ancient Greek: Λαοφόντη) was the daughter of Pleuron and Xanthippe and thus sister to Agenor, Sterope and Stratonice. She was also said to be the mother of Iphiclus, Leda and Althaea by Thestius but Alcman attested that Leda's father was Glaucus.

Notes

References 

 Apollodorus, The Library with an English Translation by Sir James George Frazer, F.B.A., F.R.S. in 2 Volumes, Cambridge, MA, Harvard University Press; London, William Heinemann Ltd. 1921. ISBN 0-674-99135-4. Online version at the Perseus Digital Library. Greek text available from the same website.

Women in Greek mythology
Aetolian characters in Greek mythology